Avonturen van een Zigeunerjongen  is a 1960 Dutch film directed by Henk van der Linden.

Cast
Louk Perry	... 	Roberto
Cor van der Linden	... 	Cor
No Bours	... 	Tuinman
Thea Eyssen	... 	Baronesse de Haghe
Frits van Wenkop	... 	Lajos
Lies Bours	... 	Lajos' vrouw
Michel Odekerken... 	Huisknecht
Wim van der Weide	... 	Zigeunerhoofdman
Hub Consten	... 	Advocaat
Diny Cuypers	... 	Mevrouw Blank

External links 
 

1960 films
Dutch black-and-white films
Films shot in the Netherlands
1960s English-language films